Church of St. Mina (Macedonian: Црква Свети Мина) is a Christian Orthodox Church in the village Proevce in Kumanovo, North Macedonia.
The church was robbed in 2014, but no major damage was caused during the robbery. There is planned renovation of the church in 2014 by DKO.

See also
Kumanovo 
St. Mina

References

External links
About St. Mina Macedonian

Churches in Kumanovo
Macedonian Orthodox churches